Donna Maree Philp (née Smith), OAM (28 June 1965 – 22 May 1999) was an Australian Paralympic athlete and wheelchair basketballer, who won six medals at four Paralympics.

Biography
Born in Brisbane, Smith was diagnosed with bone cancer at the age of thirteen, and one of her legs was amputated above the knee.

At the 1984 New York/Stoke Mandeville Paralympics, she won a gold medal in the Women's Javelin A2 event, a silver medal in the Women's Shot Put A2 event, and a bronze medal in the Women's Discus A2 event. She won a silver medal at the 1988 Seoul Paralympics in the Women's Javelin A6A8A9L6 event. At the 1992 Barcelona Paralympics, she won a gold medal in the Women's Javelin THS2 event, for which she received a Medal of the Order of Australia, and a silver medal in the Women's Shot Put THS2 event.

She then married Tom Philp, and was part of the Australia women's national wheelchair basketball team at the 1996 Atlanta Paralympics. The couple's son was 10 months old when, while playing wheelchair basketball on 22 May 1999, she died of a heart attack at the age of 33.

References

1965 births
1999 deaths
Paralympic athletes of Australia
Paralympic wheelchair basketball players of Australia
Athletes (track and field) at the 1984 Summer Paralympics
Athletes (track and field) at the 1988 Summer Paralympics
Athletes (track and field) at the 1992 Summer Paralympics
Wheelchair basketball players at the 1996 Summer Paralympics
Medalists at the 1984 Summer Paralympics
Medalists at the 1988 Summer Paralympics
Medalists at the 1992 Summer Paralympics
Paralympic gold medalists for Australia
Paralympic silver medalists for Australia
Paralympic bronze medalists for Australia
Paralympic medalists in athletics (track and field)
Discus throwers with limb difference
Shot putters with limb difference
Javelin throwers with limb difference
Paralympic discus throwers
Paralympic shot putters
Paralympic javelin throwers
Recipients of the Medal of the Order of Australia
Athletes from Brisbane
Australian female discus throwers
Australian female shot putters
Australian female javelin throwers
Australian amputees